Meeker is the Statutory Town in and the county seat  of Rio Blanco County, Colorado, United States, that is the most populous municipality in the county.  The town population was 2,475 at the 2010 United States Census.

Description
The town is largely an agricultural community, located in the wide fertile valley of the White River in northwestern Colorado. Relatively isolated from other communities, it sits near the intersection of State Highway 13 and State Highway 64, on the north side of the White River and at the base of a long ridge, known locally as China Wall. The Bureau of Land Management has a regional office in the town. Meeker is the home of the annual Meeker Classic Sheepdog trials.

History

The town is named for Nathan Meeker, the United States Indian Agent who was killed along with 11 other white citizens by White River Ute Indians in the 1879 Meeker Incident, also known as the Meeker Massacre. The site of the uprising, the former White River Indian Agency, is located along State Highway 64 in the White River valley west of town and is marked by a prominent sign. None of the buildings remain.

After the uprising and the ensuing conflict known as the Ute War, in 1880 the US Congress passed legislation requiring the Ute population to relocate to reservations in Utah. The United States Army established a garrison on the current site of the town, called the Camp at White River. The town was founded in 1883 following the removal of the troops. The White River Museum is located just north of the Rio Blanco County Courthouse and housed in several original wooden structures of the Army garrison.

The town emerged as a regional center for hunting by the turn of the 20th century. Theodore Roosevelt visited the town twice in 1901 and in 1905 on a mountain lion and bear hunting trip and stayed in the historic Hotel Meeker opposite the courthouse. The town is also a favorite summer destination and permanent residence for many prominent Americans, including billionaire Henry Kravis, former President and COO of Goldman Sachs Jon Winkelried, and comedian Daniel Tosh.

Geography
Meeker is located at  (40.039539, -107.910709).

The town is situated on the White River at an elevation of 6,250 feet above sea level.

Demographics

As of the census of 2000, there were 2,242 people, 919 households, and 605 families residing in the town. The racial makeup of the town was 96.39% White, 0.71% Native American, 0.18% Asian, 1.92% from other races, and 0.80% from two or more races. Hispanic or Latino of any race were 4.73% of the population.

There were 919 households, out of which 33.0% had children under the age of 18 living with them, 54.4% were married couples living together, 8.9% had a female householder with no husband present, and 34.1% were non-families. 29.6% of all households were made up of individuals, and 12.4% had someone living alone who was 65 years of age or older. The average household size was 2.39 and the average family size was 2.99.

In the town, the population was spread out, with 26.8% under the age of 18, 6.6% from 18 to 24, 25.4% from 25 to 44, 26.7% from 45 to 64, and 14.5% who were 65 years of age or older. The median age was 39 years. For every 100 females, there were 94.4 males. For every 100 females age 18 and over, there were 92.2 males. These numbers do not include the residents of the unincorporated area surrounding the town.

The average income for households in the unincorporated areas surrounding Meeker was $46,250. The median income for a household in the town was $34,479, and the median income for a family was $43,529. Males had a median income of $36,026 versus $18,242 for females. The per capita income for the town was $17,647. About 9.0% of families and 11.4% of the population were below the poverty line, including 15.9% of those under age 18 and 15.6% of those age 65 or over.

Climate

According to the Köppen Climate Classification system, Meeker has a warm-summer humid continental climate, abbreviated "Dfb" on climate maps.

Notable people
 Neal Blue, co-owner of General Atomics
 Virginia Neal Blue (1910-1970), Colorado State Treasurer from 1967 to 1970, and the first woman elected to executive office in the state
 Margaret L. Curry (1898–1986), Colorado state parole officer
 Buddy Roosevelt, actor and stunt performer

See also

 List of municipalities in Colorado
 Colorow Mountain State Wildlife Area, northwest of Meeker

References

External links

 
 Meeker Range Call and 4th of July Celebrations
 Flat Tops Trail Scenic Byway
 Meeker Chamber of Commerce
 Meeker Classic Sheepdog Championship Trials
 City-data.com entry for Meeker, Colorado
 Meeker Regional Library
 Pioneers Medical Center

County seats in Colorado
Towns in Colorado
Towns in Rio Blanco County, Colorado